C-type (carbonaceous) asteroids are the most common variety, forming around 75% of known asteroids. They are volatile-rich and distinguished by a very low albedo because their composition includes a large amount of carbon, in addition to rocks and minerals. They occur most frequently at the outer edge of the asteroid belt, 3.5 astronomical units (AU) from the Sun, where 80% of the asteroids are of this type, whereas only 40% of asteroids at 2 AU from the Sun are C-type. The proportion of C-types may actually be greater than this, because C-types are much darker (and therefore less detectable) than most other asteroid types except for D-types and others that are mostly at the extreme outer edge of the asteroid belt.

Characteristics
Asteroids of this class have spectra very similar to those of carbonaceous chondrite meteorites (types CI and CM). The latter are very close in chemical composition to the Sun and the primitive solar nebula minus hydrogen, helium and other volatiles. Hydrated (water-containing) minerals are present.

C-type asteroids are extremely dark, with albedos typically in the 0.03 to 0.10 range. Consequently, whereas a number of S-type asteroids can normally be viewed with binoculars at opposition, even the largest C-type asteroids require a small telescope. The potentially brightest C-type asteroid is 324 Bamberga, but that object's very high eccentricity means it rarely reaches its maximum magnitude.

Their spectra contain moderately strong ultraviolet absorption at wavelengths below about 0.4 μm to 0.5 μm, while at longer wavelengths they are largely featureless but slightly reddish. The so-called "water" absorption feature of around 3 μm, which can be an indication of water content in minerals, is also present.

Due to their volatile-rich (icy) composition, C-type asteroids have relatively low density.

The largest unequivocally C-type asteroid is 10 Hygiea, although the SMASS classification places the largest asteroid, 1 Ceres, here as well, because that scheme lacks a G-type.

C-group classifications

C-group (Tholen) 

In the Tholen classification, the C-type is grouped along with three less numerous types into a wider C-group of carbonaceous asteroids which contains:
 B-type
 C-type
 F-type
 G-type

C-group (SMASS) 

In the SMASS classification, the wider C-group contains the types:
 B-type corresponding to the Tholen B and F-types
 a core C-type for asteroids having the most "typical" spectra in the group
 Cg and Cgh types corresponding to the Tholen G-type
 Ch type with an absorption feature around 0.7μm
 Cb type corresponding to transition objects between the SMASS C and B types

See also
Asteroid spectral types

References

S. J. Bus and R. P. Binzel Phase II of the Small Main-belt Asteroid Spectroscopy Survey: A feature-based taxonomy, Icarus, Vol. 158, pp. 146 (2002). 

Asteroid spectral classes